The Bungaree Football & Netball Club is an Australian rules football and netball club from Bungaree, Victoria which competes in the Central Highlands Football League. The Demons are one of the founding members of the CHFL and most widely recognised through their best export, former St Kilda captain, Victorian representative and media personality Danny Frawley. 
The Demons play their home games at the Bungaree Recreation Reserve which underwent a full redevelopment in 2012, with the changeroom facility being named the Danny Frawley Pavilion.

Bungaree emerged from a lean decade in the 2000s to play four preliminary finals in a row from 2012–15, culminating in their first premiership in 23 years in 2014 with a 9-goal thrashing of arch rivals Springbank. The Reserves were also able to break their 34-year drought with a comprehensive win over Waubra FC.

Premierships
Seniors- 1919, 1922, 1924, 1947, 1949, 1954, 1956, 1957, 1959, 1971, 1973, 1976, 1991, 2014

Reserves- 1972, 1973, 1976, 1977, 1978, 1979, 1980, 2014

U18- 1972, 1980, 1989, 1997, 1998, 1999, 2005, 2006, 2007, 2008, 2015

U15- 1988, 2005

Champion Club
THE CHFL awards the Merv & Mary Howard Champion Club award at the conclusion of each home and away season to the club that has performed the best across 4 grades of football and 6 grades of netball. Bungaree have won the award on 10 occasions, double that of the next most successful club.

CHFL Merv & Mary Howard Champion Club- 1979, 1998, 2001, 2002, 2004, 2006, 2007, 2009, 2011, 2012

VFL/AFL players

 Danny Frawley -  ,  coach
 Maurice Frawley - 
 Danny Guinane - 
 Maurice O'Keefe - ,

Book
 History of Football in the Ballarat District by John Stoward -

References

External links
 

Australian rules football clubs in Victoria (Australia)
1904 establishments in Australia
Australian rules football clubs established in 1904